Henry Clay Van Voorhis (May 11, 1852 – December 12, 1927) was a United States Congressman from Muskingum Co., Ohio.

Biography 
He was born to Daniel and Jane (Roberts) Van Voorhis in Nashport, Ohio.

His father moved to Muskingum Co., Ohio from Washington County, Pennsylvania in 1812 with his parents,
and became a member of the Ohio Legislature during the Civil War.

Van Voorhis was educated at Denison University in Granville, Ohio and the University of Cincinnati Law School.

In 1873, he moved to Zanesville (county seat of Muskingum County, Ohio at the junction of the Muskingum and Licking Rivers).

In 1875, he married Mary A. Brown, daughter of Judge William A. and Margaret Brown. 
They had 5 children:
Ada V. (married Thomas Wylie), Dollie M.A. (married Robert S. Black), LTG Daniel (who presided over the mechanization of the US Cavalry), John A., and Margaret.

Political career 

When Van Voorhis moved to Zanesville, he became involved in the Republican Political Committee Organization. He was admitted to the bar in 1874.
In 1892, he was nominated for 53d Congress. He served in 53rd–58th Congresses, for a total of 12 years. During that time, he was a member of the Appropriations Committee.

Banker 

In 1885, Van Voorhis became President of Citizens National Bank of Zanesville Ohio. 
He relinquished the job as President of "The Old Citizens National Bank" between 1892 and 1905 (while he was in Congress), and was reelected to the post in 1905.

See also 
Charles Henry Voorhis
John Van Voorhis

Sources 

 Zanesville and Muskingum County Ohio. Thomas W. Lewis, Chicago, Ill: The S.J. Clarke Publishing Co., 1927, 3 vv, pp 1075–8.

External links 
 

American bankers
Politicians from Zanesville, Ohio
Denison University alumni
1852 births
1927 deaths
University of Cincinnati College of Law alumni
Republican Party members of the United States House of Representatives from Ohio